Mountain Rock is the third record by Portland-formed indie pop band Dear Nora. It was originally released through Magic Marker Records in 2004. In 2017, it would receive a critically applauded reissue through Orindal.

Composition
Mountain Rock has been applauded as an "overlooked anti-folk masterpiece" and an "indie pop masterpiece". It has also been called a "lo-fi folk-pop classic".

Critical reception

Mountain Rock has been welcomed with mostly positive reviews towards both its 2004 release and 2017 reissue. Quinn Moreland of Pitchfork called it Davidson's "most complex album".

References 

2004 albums
Dear Nora albums